Elyasabad or Eliasabad may refer to:
 Elyasabad, Kazerun, Fars Province
 Elyasabad, Shiraz, Fars Province
 Elyasabad, Ilam
 Elyasabad, Lorestan
 Elyasabad, West Azerbaijan